Sagina stridii is a herbaceous perennial flowering plant in the family Caryophyllaceae. It is a Greek endemic species occurring only at high altitude  at Mt. Chelmos and Mt. Killini. It was described as a new species in 2012 and was named after Swedish botanist Arne Strid.

References

stridii